Valeriano may refer to the following people

Given name
Valeriano Abello (1913–2000), Filipino scout during World War II 
Valeriano Bécquer (1833–1870), Spanish painter and graphic artist
Valeriano López (1926–1993), Peruvian football forward 
Valeriano Nchama (born 1995), Equatoguinean football midfielder
Valeriano Orobón Fernández (1901–1936), Spanish anarcho-syndicalist theoretician, trade-union activist, translator and poet
Valeriano Pellegrini (c. 1663–1746), Italian soprano singer
Valeriano Pérez (born 1941), Mexican fencer
Valeriano Rebello (born 1983), Indian football player 
Valeriano Weyler (1838–1930), Spanish general and colonial administrator

Surname
Antonio Valeriano (ca. 1531–1605), Mexican scholar and politician
Antonio Valeriano (the younger), Mexican politician, grandson of Antonio
Giuseppe Valeriano (1542–1596), Italian painter and architect
Pierio Valeriano Bolzani (1477–1558), Italian Renaissance humanist
Salvador Valeriano Pineda (born 1965), Honduran politician
Víctor Felipe Calderón Valeriano, Peruvian dancer

See also
Valeriano Lunense, a village in Italy 

 Valery (name)
 Valerie (given name)
 Valeriu (given name)
 Valerius (name)

 Valeria (given name)
 Valerian (name)
 Valerianus (disambiguation)

 Valer (disambiguation)
 Valera (disambiguation)
 Valérien (disambiguation)